The Patagonian Sheepdog or  is a Chilean breed of sheepdog. It was bred in the late nineteenth and early twentieth centuries for sheep-herding work in the Magallanes y la Antártica Chilena Region of the southern part of Chilean Patagonia. It has a long rough coat and is well adapted to the harsh climate of the area. The Kennel Club de Chile publishes a breed standard.

History 

The Patagonian Sheepdog was bred in the late nineteenth and early twentieth centuries for sheep-herding work in the Magallanes y la Antártica Chilena Region of the southern part of Chilean Patagonia. It derives from European working dogs brought to Chile by settlers from Europe; among its ancestors may be the Old Welsh Grey Sheepdog, which could have been brought by Welsh settlers to the Chubut Valley in Argentinian Patagonia.

Characteristics 

It is dog of medium stature, with a long thick coat which provides protection from the harsh weather of the Patagonian steppes and mountains.

References

External links
 genetic link to UK sheepdogs

Dog breeds originating in Chile